This list shows the IUCN Red List status of the 101 mammal species occurring in Bulgaria. Two of them are endangered, eleven are vulnerable, and four are near threatened.
The following tags are used to highlight each species' status as assessed on the respective IUCN Red List published by the International Union for Conservation of Nature:

Order: Rodentia (rodents) 

Rodents make up the largest order of mammals, with over 40% of mammalian species. They have two incisors in the upper and lower jaw which grow continually and must be kept short by gnawing. Most rodents are small though the capybara can weigh up to 45 kg (100 lb).
Suborder: Sciurognathi
Family: Sciuridae (squirrels)
Subfamily: Sciurinae
Tribe: Sciurini
Genus: Sciurus
Red squirrel, S. vulgaris 
Subfamily: Xerinae
Tribe: Marmotini
Genus: Spermophilus
 European ground squirrel, Spermophilus citellus VU
Family: Spalacidae (mole-rats)
Genus: Spalax
 Lesser mole-rat, S. leucodon DD
Family: Gliridae (dormice)
Subfamily: Leithiinae
Genus: Dryomys
 Forest dormouse, Dryomys nitedula LC
Genus: Muscardinus
 Hazel dormouse, Muscardinus avellanarius LC
Genus: Myomimus
 Roach's mouse-tailed dormouse, Myomimus roachi VU
Subfamily: Glirinae
Genus: Glis
 European edible dormouse, Glis glis LC
Family: Dipodidae (jerboas)
Subfamily: Sicistinae
Genus: Sicista
 Southern birch mouse, Sicista subtilis LC
Family: Spalacidae
Subfamily: Spalacinae
Genus: Nannospalax
 Lesser mole rat, Nannospalax leucodon VU
Family: Cricetidae
Subfamily: Cricetinae
Genus: Cricetulus
 Grey dwarf hamster, Cricetulus migratorius LC
Genus: Cricetus
European hamster, C. cricetus 
Genus: Mesocricetus
 Romanian hamster, Mesocricetus newtoni VU
Subfamily: Arvicolinae
Genus: Arvicola
European water vole, A. amphibius 
Genus: Chionomys
 Snow vole, C. nivalis LC
Genus: Clethrionomys
 Bank vole, Clethrionomys glareolus LC
Genus: Microtus
 Common vole, Microtus arvalis LC
 Günther's vole, Microtus guentheri LC
 Southern vole, Microtus rossiaemeridionalis LC
 European pine vole, Microtus subterraneus LC
Family: Muridae (mice, rats, voles, gerbils, hamsters, etc.)
Subfamily: Murinae
Genus: Apodemus
 Striped field mouse, Apodemus agrarius LC
 Western broad-toothed field mouse, Apodemus epimelas LC
 Yellow-necked mouse, Apodemus flavicollis LC
 Wood mouse, Apodemus sylvaticus LC
 Ural field mouse, Apodemus uralensis LC
Genus: Micromys
 Eurasian harvest mouse, M. minutus LC
Genus: Mus
House mouse, M. musculus 
 Macedonian mouse, Mus macedonicus LC
 Steppe mouse, Mus spicilegus LC
Genus: Rattus
 Brown rat, R. norvegicus LC
 Black rat, R. rattus

Order: Lagomorpha (lagomorphs) 

The lagomorphs comprise two families, Leporidae (hares and rabbits) and Ochotonidae (pikas). Though they can resemble rodents, and were classified as a superfamily in that order until the early 20th century, they have since been considered a separate order. They differ from rodents in having four incisors in the upper jaw rather than two.
Family: Leporidae (rabbits, hares)
Genus: Lepus
European hare, L. europaeus 
Genus: Oryctolagus
European rabbit, O. cuniculus  introduced

Order: Erinaceomorpha (hedgehogs and gymnures) 

The order Erinaceomorpha contains a single family, Erinaceidae, which comprise the hedgehogs and gymnures. The hedgehogs are easily recognised by their spines while gymnures look more like large rats.

Family: Erinaceidae (hedgehogs)
Subfamily: Erinaceinae
Genus: Erinaceus
 West European hedgehog, E. europaeus

Order: Soricomorpha (shrews, moles, and solenodons) 

The "shrew-forms" are insectivorous mammals. The shrews and solenodons closely resemble mice while the moles are stout-bodied burrowers.
Family: Soricidae (shrews)
Subfamily: Crocidurinae
Genus: Crocidura
 Bicolored shrew, C. leucodon 
Lesser white-toothed shrew, C. suaveolens 
Genus: Suncus
 Etruscan shrew, Suncus etruscus LC
Subfamily: Soricinae
Tribe: Nectogalini
Genus: Neomys
 Southern water shrew, Neomys anomalus LC
 Eurasian water shrew, Neomys fodiens LC
Tribe: Soricini
Genus: Sorex
 Common shrew, Sorex araneus LC
 Eurasian pygmy shrew, Sorex minutus LC
Family: Talpidae (moles)
Subfamily: Talpinae
Tribe: Talpini
Genus: Talpa
 European mole, Talpa europaea LC
 Levantine mole, Talpa levantis LC
 Stankovic's mole, Talpa stankovici LC

Order: Chiroptera (bats) 

The bats' most distinguishing feature is that their forelimbs are developed as wings, making them the only mammals capable of flight. Bat species account for about 20% of all mammals.
Family: Vespertilionidae
Subfamily: Myotinae
Genus: Myotis
Alcathoe bat, M. alcathoe 
Bechstein's bat, M. bechsteini 
Lesser mouse-eared bat, M. blythii 
Brandt's bat, M. brandti 
Long-fingered bat, M. capaccinii 
Pond bat, M. dasycneme 
Daubenton's bat, M. daubentonii  
Geoffroy's bat, M. emarginatus 
Greater mouse-eared bat, M. myotis 
Whiskered bat, M. mystacinus 
Natterer's bat, M. nattereri 
Subfamily: Vespertilioninae
Genus: Barbastella
Western barbastelle, B. barbastellus 
Genus: Eptesicus
 Northern bat, Eptesicus nilssoni LC
 Serotine bat, Eptesicus serotinus LC
Genus: Hypsugo
Savi's pipistrelle, H. savii 
Genus: Nyctalus
Common noctule, N. noctula 
Greater noctule bat, N. lasiopterus NT
Lesser noctule, N. leisleri 
Genus: Pipistrellus
Nathusius' pipistrelle, P. nathusii 
 Kuhl's pipistrelle, P. kuhlii LC
 Common pipistrelle, P. pipistrellus LC
 Soprano pipistrelle, P. pygmaeus LC
Genus: Plecotus
 Brown long-eared bat, Plecotus auritus LC
 Grey long-eared bat, Plecotus austriacus LC
Genus: Vespertilio
 Parti-coloured bat, Vespertilio murinus LC
Subfamily: Miniopterinae
Genus: Miniopterus
Common bent-wing bat, M. schreibersii 
Family: Molossidae
Genus: Tadarida
 European free-tailed bat, Tadarida teniotis LC
Family: Rhinolophidae
Subfamily: Rhinolophinae
Genus: Rhinolophus
Blasius's horseshoe bat, R. blasii 
Mediterranean horseshoe bat, R. euryale 
Greater horseshoe bat, R. ferrumequinum 
Lesser horseshoe bat, R. hipposideros 
Mehely's horseshoe bat, R. mehelyi

Order: Cetacea (whales) 

The order Cetacea includes whales, dolphins and porpoises. They are the mammals most fully adapted to aquatic life with a spindle-shaped nearly hairless body, protected by a thick layer of blubber, and forelimbs and tail modified to provide propulsion underwater.
Suborder: Mysticeti
Family: Balaenopteridae (rorquals)
Genus: Balaenoptera
 Common minke whale, B. acutorostrata 
Suborder: Odontoceti
Superfamily: Platanistoidea
Family: Phocoenidae
Genus: Phocoena
 Harbour porpoise, Phocoena phocoena VU
Family: Delphinidae (marine dolphins)
Genus: Tursiops
 Bottlenose dolphin, Tursiops truncatus DD
Genus: Delphinus
 Short-beaked common dolphin, Delphinus delphis LC

Order: Carnivora (carnivorans) 

There are over 260 species of carnivorans, the majority of which eat meat as their primary dietary item. They have a characteristic skull shape and dentition.
Suborder: Feliformia
Family: Felidae (cats)
Subfamily: Felinae
Genus: Felis
 European wildcat, F. silvestris 
Genus: Lynx
Eurasian lynx, L. lynx 
Suborder: Caniformia
Family: Canidae (dogs, foxes)
Genus: Vulpes
Red fox, V. vulpes 
Genus: Canis
Golden jackal, C. aureus 
Gray wolf, C. lupus 
Family: Ursidae (bears)
Genus: Ursus
Brown bear, U. arctos 
Eurasian brown bear U. a. arctos
Family: Mustelidae (mustelids)
Genus: Mustela
Stoat, M. erminea 
Steppe polecat, M. eversmannii 
Least weasel, M. nivalis 
European polecat, M. putorius 
Genus: Vormela
Marbled polecat, V. peregusna 
Genus: Martes
Beech marten, M. foina 
European pine marten, M. martes 
Genus: Meles
European badger, M. meles 
Genus: Lutra
Eurasian otter, L. lutra 
Family: Phocidae (earless seals)
Genus: Monachus
 Mediterranean monk seal, M. monachus

Order: Artiodactyla (even-toed ungulates) 

The even-toed ungulates are ungulates whose weight is borne about equally by the third and fourth toes, rather than mostly or entirely by the third as in perissodactyls. There are about 220 artiodactyl species, including many that are of great economic importance to humans.
Family: Bovidae (bovids)
Subfamily: Bovidae
Genus: Bison
European bison, B. bonasus  reintroduced
Carpathian wisent, B. b. hungarorum 
Family: Suidae (pigs)
Subfamily: Suinae
Genus: Sus
 Wild boar, S. scrofa 
Family: Cervidae (deer)
Subfamily: Cervinae
Genus: Cervus
 Red deer, C. elaphus 
Genus: Dama
 European fallow deer, D. dama 
Subfamily: Capreolinae
Genus: Capreolus
 Roe deer, C. capreolus 
Family: Bovidae (cattle, antelope, sheep, goats)
Subfamily: Caprinae
Genus: Capra
 Alpine ibex, C. ibex  introduced
Genus: Rupicapra
 Chamois, R. rupicapra

Locally extinct 
 Mediterranean monk seal, Monachus monachus
 European mink, Mustela lutreola

See also
List of chordate orders
Lists of mammals by region
List of prehistoric mammals
Mammal classification
List of mammals described in the 2000s

References

External links

Bulgaria
Mammals
Mammals
Bulgaria